The men's shot put event at the 1988 World Junior Championships in Athletics was held in Sudbury, Ontario, Canada, at Laurentian University Stadium on 29 and 30 July.  A 7257g (Senior implement) shot was used.

Medalists

Results

Final
30 July

Qualifications
29 Jul

Group A

Participation
According to an unofficial count, 17 athletes from 15 countries participated in the event.

References

Shot put
Shot put at the World Athletics U20 Championships